The Walker-Smith Baronetcy, of Broxbourne in the County of Hertford, is a title in the Baronetage of the United Kingdom. It was created on 18 July 1960 for the Conservative politician Derek Walker-Smith. On his retirement from the House of Commons in 1983 he was further honoured when he was created a life peer as Baron Broxbourne, of Broxbourne in the County of Hertfordshire. The life barony became extinct on his death in 1992 while he was succeeded in the baronetcy by his son, the second and (as of 2010) present holder of the title.

Walker-Smith Baronets, of Broxbourne (1960)
Sir Derek Colclough Walker-Smith, 1st Baronet (1910–1992) (created Baron Broxbourne in 1983)
The Hon. Sir (John) Jonah Walker-Smith, 2nd Baronet (born 1939)

References

Kidd, Charles, Williamson, David (editors). Debrett's Peerage and Baronetage (1990 edition). New York: St Martin's Press, 1990.

Walker-Smith